I'm Taking Off is the second solo album released in 2011 by Backstreet Boys member Nick Carter. The album was initially released on his own record label, Kaotic INC. The album sold over 20,000 copies during first week in Japan alone.

Background
Following the conclusion of the recording of the Backstreet Boys studio album This Is Us, Carter entered the studio to record solo material for a possible second album. On November 28, 2010, a new song, "Just One Kiss", was unveiled to Japanese radio. The song became an immediate success, peaking at number 12 on the Japan Hot 100. Thus, Carter compiled a series of tracks he had recorded, and announced that his second studio album would be released on February 2, 2011, in Japan. On the week of release, the album sold 9,928 copies, peaking at number 8, before dropping to number 17 the following week, selling 4,103 copies. In its third week on the chart, it sold a further 3,100 copies, dropping to number 30. A deluxe version of the album, with a bonus DVD, was made available on February 9.

As such, Carter decide to release the album in the United States due its success in Japan. The US release date was set for May 24, 2011. Carter also announced that the single "Just One Kiss" would receive a US release on April 5. The US version of the album replaces the track "Jewel In Our Hearts" with a new track, entitled "Remember". The US version also included a dance remix of the single "Just One Kiss". A deluxe version of the album, containing the contents of the Japanese Bonus DVD, was also made available. The album peaked at number 14 on the US Billboard Chart.

Europe became the next region to receive a release. "Just One Kiss" was released on April 29, before the album received a release on June 2. The European version of the album does not include "Jewel In Our Hearts", "Remember" or the dance remix of "Just One Kiss", however, includes two further tracks - a new composition entitled "Coma", and Carter's 2009 duet with Jennifer Paige, "Beautiful Lie". The European version of the album comes packaged in a limited edition digipak, with postcard, poster, full album booklet, four additional videos and further enhanced content.

Canada became the last country to receive a release. However, this time, a brand new song, "Love Can't Wait", was released as the album's lead single on June 21. The album was released on August 9. The Canadian version includes "Love Can't Wait" as a bonus track, but does not include "Jewel In Our Hearts", "Coma", "Remember", "Beautiful Lie" or the dance remix of "Just One Kiss". The album peaked at number 2 on the Canadian Digital Chart and number 12 at Canadian Albums Chart.

On November 15, 2011, a new version of the album was released digitally on iTunes worldwide, entitled Relaunched and Remixed. It includes a total of 16 remixes, comprising the tracks "I'm Taking Off", "So Far Away", "Love Can't Wait", "Not the Other Guy", "Just One Kiss" and "Falling Down".

Track listing

Personnel
Credits for I'm Taking Off adapted from AllMusic.

Craig Bauer - Mixing
Chuck Butler - Bass, Editing, Guitar
Nick Carter - Composer
Omar Cruz - Photography
Dan Deurloo - Assistant
Dirty Swift - Mixing
Mark Endert - Mixing
Carl Falk - Composer, Engineer, Keyboards, Mixing, Producer, Programming
Travis Ference - Engineer, Mixing
Toby Gad - Composer, Engineer, Instrumentation, Mixing, Musician, Producer
Charlie Gambetta - Composer
Matthew Gerrard - Bass, Composer, Guitar, Guitar (Acoustic), Guitar (Electric), Keyboards, Producer, Programming
Lori Graf - Executive Producer, Management
Keiko Imaizumi - Liner Notes
Jason Ingram - Composer
Doug Johnson - Assistant
Jordan Keller - Executive Producer, Legal Counsel, Management
Savan Kotecha - Composer

Brent Kutzle - Composer, Engineer, Guitar, Keyboards, Producer, Programming, Vocals
Adam Lester - Guitar
Noriyuki Makihara - Composer, Producer, Vocals
Stephen Marcussen - Mastering
The MIDI Mafia - Producer
Monte Neuble - Musician
Seiji Motoyama - Composer, Vocal Arrangement
Dan Muckala - Arranger, Composer, Engineer, Mixing, Producer, Programming, Vocal Producer, Vocals (Background)
Steven Mudd - Engineer
Lamonte Newble - Composer
Waynne Nugent - Composer
Greg Patterson - Design, Layout
Kevin Risto - Composer
Reggie Rojo, Jr. - Engineer
Yoshiyuki Sahashi - Autoharp, Guitar
Takeshi Takizawa - Engineer
Jason Turner - Executive Producer, Legal Counsel, Management
Rami Yacoub - Composer
Noel Zancanella - Composer, Drums, Engineer, Keyboards, Producer, Programming

Charts

Release History

References

2011 albums
604 Records albums
Nick Carter (musician) albums